Jaro Deppe (born 10 April 1948 in Braunschweig) is a retired German footballer. He spent eight seasons in the Bundesliga with Eintracht Braunschweig, as well as one season in the Regionalliga Nord.

References

External links

1948 births
Living people
Sportspeople from Braunschweig
German footballers
Germany youth international footballers
Eintracht Braunschweig players
Association football forwards
Bundesliga players
Footballers from Lower Saxony
20th-century German people